Nely Carla Alberto Francisca (born 2 July 1983) is a Spanish handball player for Mérignac Handball and the Spain national team.

At the 2009 World Women's Handball Championship she reached the bronze final and placed fourth with the Spanish team.  She was part of the 2011 World Championship team, who were the first Spanish women's team to win a world championship handball medal.  She was also part of the Olympic bronze medal-winning team from 2012.

References

External links

1983 births
Living people
Sportspeople from San Sebastián
Spanish people of Cape Verdean descent
Spanish sportspeople of African descent
Olympic medalists in handball
Olympic handball players of Spain
Spanish female handball players
Handball players at the 2012 Summer Olympics
Handball players at the 2016 Summer Olympics
Olympic bronze medalists for Spain
Medalists at the 2012 Summer Olympics
Expatriate handball players
Spanish expatriate sportspeople in France
Handball players from the Basque Country (autonomous community)
Mediterranean Games competitors for Spain
Competitors at the 2009 Mediterranean Games